Mallosia costata is a species of beetle in the family Cerambycidae. It was described by Maurice Pic in 1898. It is known from Turkey and Iran.

References

Saperdini
Beetles described in 1898